Songs for Pierre Chuvin is the eighteenth studio album by the Mountain Goats, released on April 10, 2020. It is the first album since 2002's All Hail West Texas to feature only the band's frontman, John Darnielle, as well as the first since then to be recorded entirely on a boombox. The album was first released via cassette only, with digital, CD, and vinyl releases following in 2021. 

Songs for Pierre Chuvin was recorded during the COVID-19 pandemic in an effort to help the band and some of their crew make ends meet in lieu of a postponed tour in the United States. Inspiration for the songs, as well as the album's title, largely came from French historian Pierre Chuvin's book A Chronicle of the Last Pagans. Darnielle recorded the tracks over a 10-day period in March 2020, releasing the songs "Exegetic Chains", "Until Olympius Returns", and "For the Snakes" on the band's YouTube channel prior to the full release.

Reception 

The online magazine Pitchfork rated Songs for Pierre Chuvin 8.1 out of 10, calling the album "a brief but thoughtful collection marked by old-school production".

Track listing

Charts

References

External links 
Merge Records Songs for Pierre Chuvin store page
Songs for Pierre Chuvin on Bandcamp

The Mountain Goats albums
2020 albums
Merge Records albums